The Ateneo Football Club is an association football club based in Quezon City in the Philippines. It is associated with the Ateneo de Manila University and the Ateneo Football Center.

The club was founded on March 1, 2004.

References

External links
Ateneo FC info
Ateneo Football Center Website 1
Ateneo Football Center Website 2

Football clubs in the Philippines
Ateneo de Manila University
Sports teams in Metro Manila
2004 establishments in the Philippines